King George V is a Docklands Light Railway (DLR) station in North Woolwich, East London, which opened on 2 December 2005. The station replaced North Woolwich railway station on the North London line and is named after King George V Dock nearby in the London Borough of Newham. King George V is in Travelcard Zone 3. Station and on-train announcements refer to the name in its only said form: 'King George the Fifth'.

History
The station opened on 2 December 2005. Until January 2009, it served as a temporary terminus for the King George V branch of DLR, but the line has since been extended through a tunnel under the River Thames to its new terminus, Woolwich Arsenal.

On 5 January 2021, a woman was injured in a serious incident at the station.

Location
The station is at the northern end of Pier Road in North Woolwich, and is within walking distance of the Woolwich Ferry.

Services
Trains run every 10 minutes to Bank in the City of London, and every 10 minutes to Stratford International station.  In the opposite direction, there is a train every five minutes to Woolwich Arsenal, a journey of around three minutes. Journey time is 9 minutes to Canning Town to interchange with the Beckton branch of the DLR, 14 minutes to Poplar to interchange with the Stratford and Lewisham branches of the DLR and 24 minutes to Bank. In peak hours, the frequency to Bank and Stratford International increases to every eight minutes, providing a service every four minutes to Canning Town.

References

External links

 Docklands Light Railway website – King George V station page

Docklands Light Railway stations in the London Borough of Newham
Railway stations in Great Britain opened in 2005